Jansenia venus is a species of tiger beetle endemic to the Western Ghats of India. It is found mainly in the summer from May to June inside forest cover. It forages on the ground inside forest but when disturbed it flies and perches on vegetation.

References 

Cicindelidae
Beetles of Asia
Endemic arthropods of India
Endemic fauna of the Western Ghats
Beetles described in 1907
Taxa named by Walther Horn